Blagoje Paunović (Serbian Cyrillic: Благоје Пауновић; 4 June 1947 – 9 December 2014) was a Serbian football defender and manager.

Playing career
Born in Pusto Šilovo, Socialist Federal Republic of Yugoslavia, he started his youth career in FK Partizan as a nine-year-old, although minimum age required to start playing for Partizan youths was ten. He was spotted by Partizan coach Virgil Popescu who insisted in bringing him over. Apart from short spell abroad, Blagoje spent most of his time in Partizan and, as a player or coach, he was part of Partizan for almost half a century. Paunović played for ten seasons with FK Partizan, amassing nearly 300 official appearances with the Belgrade club. During the 70's, he formed an efficient backline alongside Dragan Holcer and Miroslav Pavlović.

At 28, in 1975, Paunović joined FC Utrecht in the Netherlands. After two seasons abroad he returned home for a spell with OFK Kikinda, played briefly in the United States by representing the Oakland Stompers of the North American Soccer League and closed out his career also in his country's capital, with lowly FK Sinđelić; whilst in North America, he played under the name Paki Paunovich.

On the international level, Paunović played a total of 39 matches for Yugoslavia, making his debut on 12 November 1967 in a 4–0 home win against Albania for the UEFA Euro 1968 qualifiers, and participating at the final stages in Italy.

Coaching career
In the 1994–95 campaign Paunović, already a coach, was one of five managers in charge of Spain's CD Logroñés, which ranked last in La Liga with an all-time low 13 points. In 2009, after a long spell with Partizan's youth teams, he signed with Serbian first division side FK Smederevo.

Personal life
Paunović's son, Veljko, was also a footballer and later manager of Chicago Fire, Reading, and the Serbian U18, U19, and U20 teams. He too started his extensive career with Partizan, but played mainly in Spain.

References

External links
National team data 

NASL stats

1947 births
2014 deaths
People from Medveđa
Yugoslav footballers
Serbian footballers
Association football defenders
Yugoslav First League players
FK Partizan players
OFK Kikinda players
Eredivisie players
FC Utrecht players
North American Soccer League (1968–1984) players
Oakland Stompers players
Yugoslavia international footballers
UEFA Euro 1968 players
Yugoslav expatriate footballers
Serbian expatriate footballers
Expatriate footballers in the Netherlands
Expatriate soccer players in the United States
Yugoslav expatriate sportspeople in the Netherlands
Yugoslav expatriate sportspeople in the United States
Serbian football managers
La Liga managers
CD Logroñés managers
FK Teleoptik managers
FK Smederevo managers
Serbian expatriate football managers
Expatriate football managers in Spain
FK Partizan non-playing staff
Burials at Belgrade New Cemetery
Serbian expatriate sportspeople in Spain
FK Sinđelić Beograd players